The Wilson Pigott Bridge (also locally known as the State Road 31 Bridge) is a small two-lane drawbridge located near Fort Myers Shores in Lee County, Florida.  It is one of four drawbridges in Lee County.  It is 27 feet tall.

The Wilson Pigott Bridge was built in 1960, and it carries State Road 31 over the Caloosahatchee River.  This segment of State Road 31 is located between State Road 80 on the southern side of the river, and State Road 78 on the north side of the river.  The Lee Civic Center is located nearby.

It is named for Wilson Pigott, a Lee County Commissioner.

History
The Wilson Pigott Bridge opened for traffic in 1960.  It was built to replace an earlier swing bridge in Olga that previously carried State Road 31.  The now-demolished swing bridge in Olga was built in 1911 and was located about three miles upstream from the Wilson Pigott Bridge.

References

Bridges in Lee County, Florida
Bridges completed in 1960
Bascule bridges in the United States
Road bridges in Florida
Bridges over the Caloosahatchee River
1960 establishments in Florida